The following is an overview of the year 2017 in Japan.

Incumbents
Emperor: Akihito
Prime Minister: Shinzō Abe

Governors
Aichi Prefecture: Hideaki Omura
Akita Prefecture: Norihisa Satake
Aomori Prefecture: Shingo Mimura
Chiba Prefecture: Kensaku Morita
Ehime Prefecture: Tokihiro Nakamura
Fukui Prefecture: Issei Nishikawa 
Fukuoka Prefecture: Hiroshi Ogawa
Fukushima Prefecture: Masao Uchibori
Gifu Prefecture: Hajime Furuta
Gunma Prefecture: Masaaki Osawa 
Hiroshima Prefecture: Hidehiko Yuzaki
Hokkaido: Harumi Takahashi
Hyogo Prefecture: Toshizō Ido 
Ibaraki Prefecture: Masaru Hashimoto (until 26 September); Kazuhiko Ōigawa (starting 26 September)
Ishikawa Prefecture: Masanori Tanimoto
Iwate Prefecture: Takuya Tasso
Kagawa Prefecture: Keizō Hamada
Kagoshima Prefecture: Satoshi Mitazono 
Kanagawa Prefecture: Yuji Kuroiwa
Kochi: Masanao Ozaki 
Kumamoto Prefecture: Ikuo Kabashima
Kyoto Prefecture: Keiji Yamada 
Mie Prefecture: Eikei Suzuki
Miyagi Prefecture: Yoshihiro Murai
Miyazaki Prefecture: Shunji Kōno
Nagano Prefecture: Shuichi Abe
Nagasaki Prefecture: Hōdō Nakamura 
Nara Prefecture: Shōgo Arai
Niigata Prefecture: Ryūichi Yoneyama
Oita Prefecture: Katsusada Hirose
Okayama Prefecture: Ryuta Ibaragi
Okinawa Prefecture: Takeshi Onaga
Osaka Prefecture: Ichirō Matsui
Saga Prefecture: Yoshinori Yamaguchi
Saitama Prefecture: Kiyoshi Ueda 
Shiga Prefecture: Taizō Mikazuki
Shiname Prefecture: Zenbe Mizoguchi
Shizuoka Prefecture: Heita Kawakatsu
Tochigi Prefecture: Tomikazu Fukuda
Tokushima Prefecture: Kamon Iizumi
Tokyo: Yuriko Koike
Tottori Prefecture: Shinji Hirai
Toyama Prefecture: Takakazu Ishii 
Wakayama Prefecture: Yoshinobu Nisaka
Yamagata Prefecture: Mieko Yoshimura
Yamaguchi Prefecture: Tsugumasa Muraoka
Yamanashi Prefecture: Hitoshi Gotō

Events

January
 January 22 - TonenGeneral refinery fire in Arida, Wakayama Prefecture, according to Fire and Disaster Management Angency confirmed report, no one injures in this incident.

March
 March 5 - A Bell 412 helicopter crashed into Mt Hachibuse in Nagano Prefecture, According to Japan Transport Ministry official announced, nine rescue workers fatalities.
 March 27 - According to National Police Agency of Japan officials, an avalanche occurred at the climbing course in Nasu Spa Family Sky place in Tochigi Prefecture. 8 people died and 40 more were wounded; most of the victims were high-school students.

April
 April 20 - According to Japan National Police Agency confirmed report, a 384 million-yen robbery incident in Tenjin area, Fukuoka, nine person detained in this case.

May
 May 2 - According to Japan Meteorological Agency confirmed report, a largest scale eruption, with 4000 meter-high in Sakurajima, Kagoshima Prefecture.

June
 June 1 - According to Japan National Police Agency confirmed report, eight person arrested for violating customs law, who brought the equivalent of about 200 kg of gold, about 8.2 million US dollars to the fishing port without permission in Karatsu, Saga Prefecture.

July
 July 5 - A heavy torrential rain, followed by a debris flow, hit Asakura, Fukuoka Prefecture and Hita, Oita Prefecture. According to an official of the Japan Fire and Disaster Management Agency, 36 people died, with 21 wounded.

October
 October 22 - 2017 Japanese general election elections were held.
 October 30 - Suspected serial killer Takahiro Shiraishi is arrested in Tokyo.

November
November 1 – Shinzo Abe reappoints his government's cabinet ministers following his re-election as the Japanese prime minister.
Emperor Akihito announces that he intends to retire on April 30, 2019.

December
December 20 - Chen Shifeng was sentenced to 20 years in prison after the Jiang Ge Murder Case was solved.
December 31 - American youtuber Logan Paul causes international backlash after filming a video in Aokigahara.

The Nobel Prize
 Kazuo Ishiguro: 2017 Nobel Prize in Literature winner.

Arts and entertainment
2017 in anime
2017 in Japanese music
2017 in Japanese television
List of 2017 box office number-one films in Japan
List of Japanese films of 2017

Sports
 October 8 – 2017 Formula One World Championship is held at 2017 Japanese Grand Prix
 October 15 – 2017 FIA World Endurance Championship is held at 2017 6 Hours of Fuji
 October 15 – 2017 MotoGP World Championship is held at 2017 Japanese motorcycle Grand Prix

 2017 F4 Japanese Championship
 2017 Japanese Formula 3 Championship
 2017 Super Formula Championship
 2017 Super GT Series

 2017 AFC Champions League (Japan)
 2017 EAFF E-1 Football Championship (Japan)
 2017 in Japanese football
 2017 J1 League
 2017 J2 League
 2017 J3 League
 2017 Japan Football League
 2017 Japanese Regional Leagues
 2017 Japanese Super Cup
 2017 Emperor's Cup
 2017 J.League Cup

Deaths

January
January 3, Shigeru Kōyama, actor (b. 1929)
January 6, Kosei Kamo, tennis player (b. 1932)
January 15, Kozo Kinomoto, football player (b. 1949)
January 17, Tokio Kano, politician (b. 1935)
January 21, Hiroki Matsukata, actor (b. 1942)
January 22, Masaya Nakamura, businessman (b. 1925)
January 25, Shunji Fujimura, actor (b. 1934)

February
February 2, Shunichiro Okano, football player (b. 1931)
February 3
Shumon Miura, novelist (b. 1926)
Yoshiro Hayashi, politician (b. 1927)
February 7, Miho Nakayama, comedian (b. 1938)
February 8
Rina Matsuno, singer (b. 1998)
Yoshio Tsuchiya, actor (b. 1927)
February 10, Tsuyoshi Yamanaka, swimmer (b. 1939)
February 11, Jiro Taniguchi, manga artist (b. 1947)
February 13, Seijun Suzuki, filmmaker (b. 1923)
February 19, Kyoko Hayashi, author (b. 1930)
February 24, Fumio Karashima, jazz pianist (b. 1948)
February 25, Toshio Nakanishi, musician (b. 1956)

March
March 1
Hiroshi Kamayatsu, musician (b. 1939)
Yasuyuki Kuwahara, football player (b. 1942)
March 4, Takashi Inoue, actor (b. 1960)
March 7
Yoshiyuki Arai, politician (b. 1934)
Yukinori Miyabe, speed skater (b. 1968)
March 9, Kasugafuji Akihiro, sumo wrestler (b. 1966)
March 13
Hiroto Muraoka, football player (b. 1931)
Morihiro Hashimoto, darts player (b. 1977)
March 14, Tsunehiko Watase, actor (b. 1944)
March 19, Tomiko Okazaki, politician (b. 1944)
March 20, Shuntaro Hida, physician (b. 1917)
March 22, Daisuke Satō, writer (b. 1964)

April
April 1
Shigeaki Uno, political scientist (b. 1930)
Ikutaro Kakehashi, engineer, entrepreneur (b. 1930)
April 5
Makoto Ōoka, poet (b. 1931)
Ryo Kagawa, folk singer (b. 1947)
April 12
Toshio Matsumoto, film director (b. 1932)
Peggy Hayama, singer (b. 1933)
April 13, Norio Shioyama, animator (b. 1940)
April 17, Shōichi Watanabe, scholar (b. 1930)
April 22
Hiroshi Nakai, politician (b. 1942)
Noritoshi Kanai, businessman (b. 1923)
April 27, Sadanoyama Shinmatsu, sumo wrestler (b. 1938)

May
May 3, Yumeji Tsukioka, actress (b. 1922)
May 7, Yoshimitsu Banno, film director (b. 1931)
May 10, Gaisi Takeuti, mathematician (b. 1926)
May 15, Takeshi Kusaka, actor (b. 1931)
May 23, Kaoru Yosano, politician (b. 1938)

June
June 6, Keiichi Tahara, photographer (b. 1951)
June 12, Masahide Ōta, academic, politician (b. 1925)
June 13, Yōko Nogiwa, actress (b. 1936)
June 22, Mao Kobayashi, newscaster (b. 1982)
June 23, Nobuyuki Ōuchi, shogi player (b. 1941)
June 27, Ryoichi Jinnai, businessman (b. 1927)
June 28, Shinji Mori, baseball player (b. 1974)

July
July 4, Masatoshi Yoshino, geographer, climatologist (b. 1928)
July 8, Seiji Yokoyama, musician (b. 1935)
July 11, Keisuke Sagawa, actor (b. 1937)
July 18, Shigeaki Hinohara, physician (b. 1911)
July 24, Michiko Inukai, author, philanthropist (b. 1921)
July 25, Tarō Kimura, politician (b. 1965)

August
August 1, Shōgorō Nishimura, film director (b. 1930)
August 3, Iwao Ōtani, recording engineer (b. 1919)
August 7, Haruo Nakajima, actor (b. 1929)
August 18, Tadayoshi Nagashima, politician (b. 1951)
August 28, Tsutomu Hata, politician (b. 1935)
August 30, Sumiteru Taniguchi, activist (b. 1929)

September
September 7, Tsunenori Kawai, politician (b. 1937)
September 8, Toshihiko Nakajima, actor (b. 1962)
September 18, Kenji Watanabe, swimmer (b. 1969)
September 25, Yoshitomo Tokugawa, photographer (b. 1950)
September 29, Ryūji Saikachi, voice actor (b. 1928)

October
October 4, Yosihiko H. Sinoto, anthropologist (b. 1924)
October 11, Chikara Hashimoto, baseball player (b. 1933)
October 16, Koichi Kishi, politician (b. 1940)
October 18, Taizo Nishimuro, businessman (b. 1935)

November
November 16, Hiromi Tsuru, voice actress (b. 1960)
November 21, Masao Sugiuchi, go player (b. 1920)

December
December 2, Norihiko Hashida, musician (b. 1945)
December 8, Atsutoshi Nishida, businessman (b. 1943)
December 9, Heitaro Nakajima, engineer (b. 1921)
December 14, Tamio Ōki, voice actor (b. 1928)
December 15, Michiru Shimada, screenwriter (b. 1959)
December 20, Kenichi Yamamoto, engineer and businessman (b. 1922)
December 21, Chu Ishikawa, composer (b. 1966)
December 28, Junko Maya, actress (b. 1942)
December 30
Tatsuro Toyoda, businessman (b. 1929)
Sansho Shinsui, actor (b. 1947)

Elections

National 
 October 22: By-elections to the National Diet; 2 vacancies as of July 31, both from the House of Representatives: Ehime 3rd district and Aomori 4th district

Prefectural 
 January 22: Yamagata gubernatorial (w/o vote)
 January 29: Gifu gubernatorial
 March 26: Chiba gubernatorial
 April 9: Akita gubernatorial
 June 25: Shizuoka gubernatorial
 July 2: Tokyo legislative, Hyōgo gubernatorial
 August 27: Ibaraki gubernatorial
 October 22: Miyagi gubernatorial
 November 12: Hiroshima gubernatorial

Major municipal 
Elections in the 20 designated major cities and the 23 special wards/"cities":
 January 29: Kitakyūshū, Fukuoka legislative
 February 5: Chiyoda, Tokyo mayoral
 March 26: Shizuoka, Shizuoka legislative
 April 23: Nagoya, Aichi mayoral
 May 21: Saitama, Saitama mayoral 
 May 28: Chiba, Chiba mayoral
 July 23: Sendai, Miyagi mayoral
 July 30: Yokohama, Kanagawa mayoral
 September 24: Sakai, Osaka mayoral
 October 1: Okayama, Okayama mayoral
 October 22: Kawasaki, Kanagawa mayoral, Kōbe, Hyōgo mayoral
 before December 18/November 12 (ends of term; but both elections were held on the same day in 2013): Katsushika, Tokyo mayoral and legislative

References

 
Japan
Years of the 21st century in Japan
Japan
2010s in Japan